Landmark Place is the tallest building in downtown Hamilton, Ontario, Canada, at the corner of Main Street East and Catharine Street South in the Corktown neighbourhood. This 43-storey building (130 metres/427 feet) was completed in 1974, and was originally known as the Century 21 building. It was built by Al Frisina as a mixed use building; commercial, residential and retail. Original plans included adding a heliport and a revolving rooftop restaurant but those plans were scrapped. Frisina also believes that no other building will be built in Hamilton taller than Landmark Place because as he puts it; 'the demand's not there and nobody's crazy enough to do it.' In the early 1960s, Frisina took on Hamilton's six-storey height limit. He brought in a consultant who told the city it could save money on services by building up instead of out. Frisina won and built the 18-storey Clarendon on Hunter near Bay. Today it is known as The Fontainebleu.

The top 5 floors of the building are now occupied by luxury suites.

Images

See also
List of tallest buildings in Hamilton, Ontario

References

External links
Hamilton Skyscraper page- diagrams
Image #1: Landmark Place
Image #2: Landmark Place

Buildings and structures completed in 1974
Buildings and structures in Hamilton, Ontario
Modernist architecture in Canada